Jack O'Sullivan (the Bosco) (11 June 1906 – 18 June 1972) was an Australian rules footballer who played with North Melbourne in the Victorian Football League (VFL). He won the Wangaratta Gift in 1927 and 1929.

Notes

External links

1906 births
1972 deaths
Australian rules footballers from Victoria (Australia)
North Melbourne Football Club players